Otter Creek Junction is an unincorporated community in Otter Creek Township, Vigo County, in the U.S. state of Indiana.

It is part of the Terre Haute metropolitan area.

History
Otter Creek Junction was originally built at a flag station on the C. & E. I. Rail Road.
The community takes its name from the nearby Otter Creek.

Geography

References

Unincorporated communities in Indiana
Unincorporated communities in Vigo County, Indiana
Terre Haute metropolitan area